The 1997 Historic Grand Prix of Monaco was the inaugural running of the Historic Grand Prix of Monaco, a motor racing event for heritage Grand Prix, Voiturettes, Formula One, Formula Two and Sports cars.

Report 
1997 represented the 700th anniversary of the Grimaldi family's presidency over Monaco. Celebrations were held throughout the year and among these was a series of historic motor races at the Circuit de Monaco. It was initially conceived as a one-off, but proved so popular that it was later revived as a biennial event from 2000.

The 1979 Monaco Grand Prix had featured a support race for historic cars, won by Martin Morris in ERA R11B. Additional historic races had been held in support of the 1982 (winner Bruce Halford was in attendance at this event) and 1983 events under the suggestion of the Hon. Patrick Lindsay. His son Valentine, along with Peter Hannen and Max Poggi, were responsible for organising the 1997 event to tie in with the 700th anniversary. Valentine's two brothers would race in the event itself: James drove an Alfa Romeo 8C Monza in Race A (crashing out in practice), while Ludovic drove a Ferrari 375 in Race B and a Maserati 250F in Race D. Ludovic crashed in practice for Race B, sustaining minor injuries, but still raced.

Hannen took part in Races B and C, taking second place in both. In Race C, he was forced to start from the pit lane after mistakenly believing his steering was damaged on the formation lap. He put on an overtaking masterclass and finished second, having pressured race leaders Frank Sytner and Emanuele Pirro for much of the race.

1968 Monaco Grand Prix runner-up Richard Attwood impressed with his performance in Race D and also set the fastest lap. A third former F1 driver was three-time Monaco Grand Prix winner Stirling Moss. He was entered for Race D but suffered a cylinder head failure and did not start. He gave a strong showing in Race E, running third until a somewhat reluctant Martin Stretton passed him.

Phil Hill was slated to appear in a Ferrari Testa Rossa but did not feature in the event.

During the weekend, Prince Rainier unveiled a statue of Louis Chiron at the Piscine which still stands today.

Results

Summary

Série A: Pre 1934 two-seater Grand Prix cars

Série B: Pre 1952 Grand Prix cars

Série C: Pre 1959 Ferrari sports cars

Série D: Pre 1960 Grand Prix cars

Série E: Pre 1960 sports cars

Série F: Pre 1968 Grand Prix cars

Série G: Formula Junior

References 

Historic motorsport events
Monaco Grand Prix
Historic Grand Prix of Monaco
Historic Grand Prix of Monaco